Gregory B. Huber (born January 25, 1956) is a retired American lawyer, politician, and judge.  He served 18 years as a Wisconsin circuit court judge in Marathon County and was chief judge of the 9th District of Wisconsin Circuit Courts from 2016 through 2022.  Previously, he represented northern Marathon County as a Democratic member of the Wisconsin State Assembly.

Biography

Born in Wausau, Wisconsin, Huber graduated from Watertown High School, in Watertown, Wisconsin. He received his bachelors and law degrees from the University of Wisconsin–Madison in 1978 and 1981, respectively.  In his early legal career, Huber worked as an assistant district attorney in Marathon County, and a law clerk for the Wisconsin Circuit Court in Outagamie County.

In 1988, after incumbent state representative John H. Robinson resigned his seat to take office as Mayor of Wausau, Huber announced his candidacy to replace him.  Huber narrowly won a three-way race in the Democratic primary, finishing 168 votes ahead of county planner Larry Saeger.  He went on to another close victory in the November general election, which, after a recount, produced a final margin of 203 votes for Huber over Republican David M. Torkko.

After his narrow 1988 victory, Huber was re-elected seven times, serving until 2004.  He served for several sessions on the influential Joint Finance Committee and the Joint Legislative Council.  During the Democratic majorities in the 1991 and 1993 sessions, he was chairman of the committees of Reapportionment (1991), Tax Delinquent Contaminated Land (1991), and Elections, Constitutional Law and Corrections (1993).

Huber's path to the Circuit Court judgeship started with the July 2003 announcement by incumbent judge Raymond F. Thums that he would retire by the end of the year.  A special election was scheduled for April 2004 with a primary in February.  Huber topped the primary with nearly 50% of the vote, and went on to win election over lawyer and counselor Coleen Kennedy.  After his election, he was appointed to begin his term early, in June 2004, since the seat was already vacant.  He was re-elected in 2010 and 2016 without opposition.

In 2016, the Wisconsin Supreme Court appointed him to be Chief Judge of the 9th District of Wisconsin Circuit Courts, replacing Judge Neal Nielsen of Vilas County.  He was subsequently re-appointed in 2018 and 2020.  He was not eligible for another term as Chief Judge and retired at the end of his term in 2022.

Electoral history

Wisconsin Assembly (1988–2002)

| colspan="6" style="text-align:center;background-color: #e9e9e9;"| Democratic Primary, September 13, 1988

| colspan="6" style="text-align:center;background-color: #e9e9e9;"| General Election, November 8, 1988

Wisconsin Circuit Court (2004–present)

| colspan="6" style="text-align:center;background-color: #e9e9e9;"| Nonpartisan Primary, February 17, 2004

| colspan="6" style="text-align:center;background-color: #e9e9e9;"| General Election, April 6, 2004

References

External links
 
 
 Follow the Money - Gregory Huber
2002 2000 1998 campaign contributions

Politicians from Wausau, Wisconsin
University of Wisconsin–Madison alumni
University of Wisconsin Law School alumni
Wisconsin state court judges
Members of the Wisconsin State Assembly
1956 births
Living people
21st-century American politicians